Basilique Notre-Dame is the French name for a number of Basilicas dedicated to the Virgin Mary. 
These include:

Notre-Dame d'Afrique, Byzantine Revival building in Algiers, Algeria, inaugurated in 1872
Basilica of Notre-Dame d'Alençon, 15th century Gothic building in Alençon, Orne, France
Basilique Notre-Dame de Brebières 19th century Albert, France
Basilique Notre-Dame de Bonsecours, Gothic Revival building in Bonsecours, Normandy, France, completed in 1844
Basilica of Notre-Dame de Boulogne, Classical and Renaissance building in Boulogne, France
Notre-Dame de la Daurade, 19th century building in Toulouse, France
Basilique Notre-Dame de la Délivrance, minor basilica in Popenguine, Senegal dedicated in 1991
Notre-Dame de l'Épine, Flamboyant Gothic building in L'Épine, Marne, France built in 1527
Basilica of Notre-Dame de Fourvière, Romanesque and Byzantine building in Lyon, France, completed in 1884
Notre-Dame de la Garde, Romanesque building in Marseille, France, consecrated in 1864
Basilica of Our Lady of Geneva, Neo-Gothic building in Geneva, Switzerland, completed in 1857
Basilica of Our Lady of the Immaculate Conception, consecrated in 1876 in Lourdes, France
Basilica of the Blessed Virgin Mary, Lodonga, 1961 building in Lodonga, Uganda
Notre-Dame Basilica (Montreal), Gothic Revival building in Montreal, Quebec, Canada completed in 1843
Notre-Dame de Nice, Gothic Revival building in Nice, France, completed in 1868
Basilique de Notre Dame de la Paix in Yamoussoukro, Ivory Coast, modelled on the Basilica of Saint Peter in Rome and consecrated in 1990 
Basilica of Notre-Dame du Port, Romanesque building in Auvergne, France
Cathedral-Basilica of Notre-Dame de Québec, Neo-classic building in Québec, Canada, dating to 1743
Notre-Dame de la Trinité Basilica in Blois, Loir-et-Cher, France, consecrated in 1949
Basilica of Notre-Dame-des-Victoires, Paris, completed in 1737